The men's triple jump event at the 1930 British Empire Games was held on 17 August at the Civic Stadium in Hamilton, Canada.

Results

References

Athletics at the 1930 British Empire Games
1930